Clan Muir is a Scottish clan that is armigerous. Historically, holders of the surname Muir (also spelt Moor, Moore, More, and Mure) can be considered septs of Clan Campbell and Moir are the septs of Clan Gordon in the highlands. The spelling variation More/Moore is a sept of Clan Leslie in Aberdeenshire. Some members of Clan Muir who trace their ancestry to Ayrshire are septs of Clan Boyd. A single family, the Mores/Moores of Drumcork, are septs of Clan Grant.

Origins and history

The Scottish surname Muir supposedly originated as a surname denoting someone who lived beside a moor. The name is derived from the Scots form of the Middle English more, meaning "moor" or "fen". That being said, the Mure/Muir/Moore line of Southwest Scotland has been proven not to be Gael, but rather, genetically of Pretani/Britonic origin (likely even identifiable to the Iron Age Damnonii tribe in the area), known to be typical of the area before Scots dominated control in the 11th century.

Mures of Rowallan
While it has been suggested that the family was from Ireland, Y DNA results clearly suggest they are from Southwest Scotland. Polkelly seems to have been the most ancient property held in Scotland by the Mures.

The Mures were prominent figures throughout the history of Scotland, from Sir Gilchrist Mure, who married the daughter and sole heir of Sir Walter Comyn with the blessing of King Alexander III, for his part in the Battle of Largs, 1263. This secured the family seat at Rowallan Castle. Another version states that Gilchrist Mure was dispossessed of the house and living at Rowallan by the strong hand of Sir Walter Cuming, and was compelled to keep close in his castle of Polkelly until Alexander III raised sufficient forces to subdue Cuming and his adherents. The family had held Rowallan, in this version, from unknown antiquity.

The conjoined arms of the first Muir of Rowallan were visible on the oldest part of the castle up until the 18th century. Elizabeth Mure, daughter of Sir Adam Mure of Rowallan and Janet Mure, married Robert Stewart, later King Robert II of Scotland, and bore him nine children before November 22, 1347, when their marriage was legitimized by papal dispensation. Elizabeth died sometime before 1355.

Sir Gilchrist Muir built two chapels, one at the Well named for Saint Laurence and the other at Banked named for Saint Michael. The vestiges of these were still visible in 1876. He also built the chapel of Kilmarnock, commonly called Mures Isle (or aisle).

One of the Sir Robert Mure was slain at the Battle of Sark. His namesake was called the Rud of Rowallane, being large in stature, very strong and prone to pugilism; these characteristics neatly define the meaning of this archaic Scots word. He wasted his inheritance and during his lifetime a protracted feud took place with the house of Ardoch (Craufurdland) which resulted in much bloodshed. The 'Rud' resigned his lands in favour of his grandson John, who married Margaret Boyd a mistress of James IV.

Campbells, later Lairds of Rowallan

Sir William Mure was the sixteenth and last Mure of Rowallan. He served in Germany under Gustavus Adolphus. One of his grand-daughters married Sir James Campbell of Lawers, third son of the Earl of Loudoun, who thus became Laird of Rowallan. His son, Major-General James Mure Campbell of Rowallan (1726–86), became the fifth Earl of Loudoun in 1782. His only daughter's great-grandson, Charles Rawdon-Hastings, 11th Earl of Loudoun succeeded in 1874 and held the lands of Rowallan as Laird.

Cadet branches
Sir Adam Mure's three younger brothers gave rise to numerous branches of the Mure family who settled in Caldwell, Aucheneil, Thornton, Glanderstoun, Treescraig, Auchendrane, Cloncaird, Craighead Park, Middleston, Spittleside and Brownhill.

Clan motto

Motto - Durum Patientia Frango (By patience I break what is hard).

Associated names
Clan Muir does not have any septs, though common variations of the name Muir or Moore are associated with the clan. Muir/More/Moore/Mure are most prevalent in Ayrshire and areas in the Southwest lowlands, though branches had spread to Eastern Scotland as early as the 15th century.

Clan affiliation by spelling variation
Muir/Mure/Moore - more common in Clan Campbell
Moir/Moire - more common in Clan Gordon
Moore - more common in Clan Leslie
Moore/More - more common in Clan Grant

Clan membership
Clan membership is determined by surname. According to Sir Crispin Agnew of Lochnaw, if a person has a particular sept name which can be attributed to a number of clans, either they should determine from which part of Scotland their family originally came from and owe allegiance to the clan of that area or, alternatively, if they do not know where they came from, they should owe allegiance to the clan to which their family had traditionally owed allegiance.  Alternatively, they may offer allegiance to any of the particular named clans in the hope that the Chief will accept them as a member of his clan.  Thus if a person offers his allegiance to a particular Chief by joining his clan society or by wearing his tartan, he can be deemed to have elected to join that particular clan and should be viewed as a member of that clan. Members of Clan Muir who do not give their allegiance to any of the clans that list their surname as a sept or who do not have a family history of belonging to any of the aforementioned clans wear the Muir tartan.

See also
Armigerous clan
Clan Boyd
Clan Campbell
Clan Gordon
Clan Grant
Clan Leslie
Clan Muir
House of Windsor

References

External links
Clan Muir Society
Clan Muir of Australia
Electric Scotland website

Muir
Muir